Algoma Progress was a self-unloading lake freighter and bulk carrier operating on the North American Great Lakes, owned by Algoma Central. Launched in 1968, the ship was originally named Canadian Progress and operated by the Upper Lakes Shipping. At launch, the ship was the largest self-unloading vessel on the Great Lakes. Canadian Progress was used to transport coal, iron ore, barley and road salt on the Great Lakes and Saint Lawrence Seaway. Canadian Progress ran aground twice, the first in 1985 and then again in 1988. In 2011, Upper Lakes Shipping sold its entire fleet to Algoma Central, which renamed the vessel Algoma Progress. In 2014, Algoma Progress was sold for scrap and broken up at Port Colborne, Ontario.

Description
The ship had a gross register tonnage (GRT) of 21,436 and a deadweight tonnage (DWT) of 31,751. To reduce weight, the hatch covers were made of aluminum.

The engines drove one shaft turning a controllable pitch propeller and power a  bow thruster. As a self-unloading vessel, the bulk carrier was equipped with a stern-mounted  discharge boom.

Construction and career
The vessel was laid down on 5 June 1967 at Port Weller Dry Docks, St. Catharines, Ontario with the yard number 48. Canadian Progress was launched on 5 July 1968 and completed in August. At launch, Canadian Progress was the largest self-unloading vessel on the Great Lakes. The vessel was used to transport coal, iron ore, barley and road salt through the Great Lakes and the Saint Lawrence Seaway. During its career, the bulk carrier set several shipping records on the Great Lakes. The ship had been sailing to Chicago, Illinois with a load of coal. To free the ship, tugboats were required to assist Canadian Progress. In 1988, while transporting a load of coal Canadian Progress ran aground on Ballard's Reef, requiring tugboat assistance.

In February 2011, Upper Lakes Shipping sold its fleet to Algoma Central. The ship was renamed Algoma Progress and officially entered service with its new owners on 31 July 2011. Algoma Progress continued in service until 2014, when Algoma Central sold the vessel to International Marine Salvage for scrap. The ship was towed to Port Colborne, Ontario where demolition was reported completed on 30 December 2014.

References

External links

1968 ships
Merchant ships of Canada
Great Lakes freighters
Algoma Central Marine
Ships built in Ontario